Tryphena Sparks (20 March 1851 – 17 March 1890), born in Puddletown, Dorset, the youngest child of James and Maria Sparks, was Thomas Hardy's cousin and possible lover, when she was 16 and he was 26. Hardy's mother suggested that Tryphena was not actually his cousin but his niece and he was thus prevented from marrying her. There are also suggestions that she had Hardy's child, a son called Randolph. The relationship ended when Hardy became engaged to Emma Gifford.  She is considered by John Fowles an "important figure in both his emotional and imaginative life" and author Nicholas Hillyard considers that the affair is important in relation to Hardy's start as a novelist and poet.

Sparks was the inspiration for Hardy's poem Thoughts of Phena at News of Her Death in which Hardy describes her as his "lost prize". She may also have inspired Hardy's story that later became Far from the Madding Crowd. Other Hardy poems have been connected to Sparks, including In A Eweleaze Near Weatherbury,  At Rushy Pond, A Spot, The Wind's Prophecy, To an Orphan Child, and To a Motherless Child, which is addressed to Tryphena's daughter whom he had met when visiting Topsham. The character of Sue Bridehead in Hardy's book Jude The Obscure is also thought to have been based on Sparks and in the book's preface Hardy says that the circumstances of the novel had been suggested by the death of a woman in 1890.

Sparks is the subject of ten separate 1960s publications by author Lois Deacon including  Tryphena, Thomas Hardy and Hardy's Sweetest Image  and Providence and Mr Hardy published in 1966.

Having attended Stockwell Training College from 1870 to 1871, Sparks became headmistress of Plymouth Day School in 1872. In 1873 she met  Charles Frederick Gale, a publican from Topsham, Devon and they were married on 15 December 1877 at Plymouth. She was known in Topsham for the charitable work she did for the local fishermen. She had four children: Eleanor, Charles, George and Herbert. She died from a rupture caused by childbirth and is buried in Topsham, Devon. Hardy and his brother Henry visited her grave, leaving a note saying "In loving memory -Tom Hardy".

References

External links
 Letters from Tryphena Sparks held by the National Archives

1851 births
1890 deaths
People from West Dorset District
Burials in Devon
Thomas Hardy